Andrea Bari (born 5 March 1980) is an Italian volleyball player, a member of Italy men's national volleyball team in 2010–2013 and Italian club Monini Marconi Spoleto, bronze medalist of the Olympic Games London 2012, silver medalist of the 2011 European Championship, three-time Italian Champion. He is a multiple winner of the CEV Champions League and FIVB Volleyball Men's Club World Championship with the Italian club Trentino Volley.

Career

National team
In 2011 Italy, including Bari, won a silver medal of the European Championship 2011 after lost match with Serbia. Bari received individual award for the Best Libero. In next year Italian team won bronze at Olympics - London 2012 in 3rd place match against Bulgaria.

Sporting achievements

CEV Champions League
  2008/2009 - with Itas Diatec Trentino
  2009/2010 - with Itas Diatec Trentino
  2010/2011 - with Itas Diatec Trentino
  2011/2012 - with Itas Diatec Trentino
  2016/2017 - with Sir Sicoma Colussi Perugia

FIVB Club World Championship

  Qatar 2009 - with Itas Diatec Trentino
  Qatar 2010 - with Itas Diatec Trentino
  Qatar 2011 - with Itas Diatec Trentino

National championship
 2007/2008  Italian Championship, with Itas Diatec Trentino
 2008/2009  Italian Championship, with Itas Diatec Trentino
 2009/2010  Italian Cup Serie A, with Itas Diatec Trentino
 2009/2010  Italian Championship, with Itas Diatec Trentino
 2010/2011  Italian Championship, with Itas Diatec Trentino
 2011/2012  Italian Cup Serie A, with Itas Diatec Trentino
 2011/2012  Italian Championship, with Itas Diatec Trentino
 2012/2013  Italian Championship, with Itas Diatec Trentino

National team
 2011  CEV European Championship
 2012  Olympic Games

Individually
 2010 CEV Champions League - Best Libero
 2011 CEV Champions League - Best Libero
 2011 CEV European Championship - Best Libero

References

External links

 
 
 
 
 LegaVolley Serie A player profile 

1980 births
Living people
Italian men's volleyball players
Olympic volleyball players of Italy
Olympic medalists in volleyball
Olympic bronze medalists for Italy
Volleyball players at the 2012 Summer Olympics
Medalists at the 2012 Summer Olympics
Italian Champions of men's volleyball
People from Senigallia
Sportspeople from the Province of Ancona